The 44th Academy of Country Music Awards were held on April 5, 2009, at the MGM Grand Garden Arena, Las Vegas, Nevada. The ceremony was hosted by ACM Award winner Reba McEntire.

Winners and nominees 
Winners are shown in bold.

Performers

Presenters

References 

Academy of Country Music Awards
Academy of Country Music Awards
Academy of Country Music Awards
Academy of Country Music Awards
Academy of Country Music Awards
Academy of Country Music Awards